Lewiston Dam is an earthfill dam on the Trinity River that forms Lewiston Lake near Weaverville, California, United States. Construction was completed in 1963. Lewiston Lake and Dam are part of the Central Valley Project, which harnesses the waters from the Sacramento River and San Joaquin River watersheds to irrigate the Central Valley, and provide hydroelectricity.

See also
List of dams and reservoirs in California

References

External links
BOR: Central Valley Operations Office

Dams on the Trinity River (California)
Earth-filled dams
Buildings and structures in Trinity County, California
Central Valley Project
Weaverville, California
Dams completed in 1963
Dams in California
United States Bureau of Reclamation dams